The Ackerman Charter School District  is a public charter school district in Auburn, California. 

Its sole school campus, Bowman Charter School, is a public charter school for students in grades transitional-kindergarten through eighth grade. As of the 2016–17 school year, the Ackerman Charter School District serves approximately 587 students.

References

External links
 
 Placer County Office of Education's listing for Ackerman Charter School District
 School Accountability Report Card (SARC) for Bowman Charter School

School districts in Placer County, California